Lithuania participated in the 2010 Summer Youth Olympics in Singapore City, Singapore. 24 athletes received the right to participate in championships: 7 track and field athletes, 4 basketball players, 3 swimmers, 2 boxers, 2 modern pentathlon athletes, 2 judo athletes, 1 gymnast, 1 rower, 1 canoer, 1 sailer.

Medalists

Qualified athletes

Athletics

Boys
Track and Road Events

Field Events

1 - Athlete reached national 17 y.o. record.

Girls
Track and Road Events

Field Events

Basketball

Boys

Boxing 

Boys

Canoeing 

Boys

Gymnastics

Artistic Gymnastics

Boys

Judo 

Individual

Team

Modern pentathlon

Rowing

Boys

Sailing 

Boys

Swimming 

Boys 

Girls

References

External links

Competitors List: Lithuania

2010 in Lithuanian sport
Nations at the 2010 Summer Youth Olympics
Lithuania at the Youth Olympics